Blanche is a feminine given name. It means "white" in French, derived from the Late Latin word "blancus". It is a popular 20th-century name in England.

People

French royalty
Blanche of Castile (1188–1252), Queen of France, granddaughter of Blanca of Navarre (daughter of Garcia VI)
Blanche of Navarre, Queen of France (Blanche d'Évreux, 1330–1398)
Blanche of France, Infanta of Castile (1253–1323), daughter of King Louis IX of France, wife of Fernando, the eldest son of Alfonso X of Castile
Blanche of France, Duchess of Austria (c. 1278–1305), daughter of King Philip II of France, wife of Rudolf I of Bohemia
Blanche of France (nun) (1313–1358), daughter of King Philip V of France
Blanche of France, Duchess of Orléans (1328–1382), posthumous daughter of King Charles IV of France, Duchess consort of Orleans
Blanche of Burgundy, Queen of France

Navarrese royalty
Blanche of Navarre, Queen of Castile (after 1133 – 1156), daughter of García Ramírez of Navarre, wife of King Sancho III of Castile
Blanche of Navarre, Countess of Champagne (died 1229), Countess of Champagne and regent of Navarre
Blanche of Artois (1248–1302), queen consort and regent of Navarre
Blanche of Navarre, Duchess of Brittany (1226–1283), also known as Blanche of Champagne, wife of duke John I of Brittany
Blanche I of Navarre (1385–1441), queen regnant of Navarre, wife of John II of Navarre
Blanche II of Navarre (1424–1464), daughter of Blanche I of Navarre; pretender of Navarre, divorced Queen of Castile

Other nobility
Blanche of Namur (1320–1363), queen-consort of Norway and Sweden
Duchess Blanche of England (1392–1409), also known as Blanche of Lancaster, daughter of King Henry IV
Blanche of Brittany (1271–1327), mother of Robert III of Artois
Blanche of Sicily, wife of Robert III of Flanders
Blanche of Anjou (1280–1310), wife of James II of Aragon
Lady Blanche Arundell (1583 or c. 1584–1649), wife of Thomas Arundell, 2nd Baron Arundell of Wardour
Blanche de Brienne, Baroness Tingry (c. 1252–c. 1302)
Blanche del Carretto (1432–1458), Lady Consort of Monaco
Lady Blanche, daughter of Charles Noel, 2nd Earl of Gainsborough
Blanche of Valois (1316–1348), wife of Charles IV, Holy Roman Emperor

Other people
Blanche (singer), stage name of Belgian singer and songwriter Ellie Delvaux
Blanche d'Alpuget (born 1944), Australian novelist and biographer, second wife of Australian Prime Minister Bob Hawke
Blanche Baker (born 1956), American actress
Blanche Hermine Barbot (1842–1919), Belgian-American musical director and pianist
Blanche Barrow (1911–1988), husband of Buck Barrow
Blanche Bates (1873–1941), American actress
Blanche Bernstein (died 1993), American economist
Blanche Bingley (1863–1946), English tennis player
Blanche Bolduc (1906/1907–1998), Canadian folk singer
Blanche Brillon Macdonald (1931–1985), Canadian Métis politician
Blanche Bruce (1841–1898), first African-American to serve a full term in the United States Senate
Blanche Calloway (1902–1978), African-American jazz singer
Blanche Crozier (1881–1957), Canadian actress
Blanche Wiesen Cook (born 1941), American professor of history and author
Blanche Deschamps-Jéhin (1857–1923), French operatic contralto
Blanche Dugdale (1880–1948), British author and Zionist
Blanche Friderici (1878—1933), American film and stage actress
Blanche Gardin (born 1977), French actress, comedian and writer
Blanche Jenkins (active 1872–1915), British portrait painter
Blanche Lazzell (1878–1956), American modernist painter and printmaker
Blanche Douglass Leathers, first female steamboat captain
Blanche Lincoln (born 1960), senator from Arkansas
Blanche Martin (born 1937), American Football League player
Blanche McManus (1869–1935), American writer and artist
Blanche L. McSmith (1920-2006), American politician
Blanche Hoschedé Monet (1865–1947), French painter, both stepdaughter and daughter-in law of Claude Monet
Blanche Oelrichs (1890–1950), American actress and poet
Blanche Ravalec (born 1954), French actress
Blanche Scott (1885–1970), American aviator
Blanche Sweet (1896–1986), American early silent film actress
Blanche Thebom (1915–2010), American operatic soprano
Blanche Walsh (1873–1915), American actress
Blanche Yurka (1887–1974), American stage and film actress and director

Fictional characters
 Blanche, an ostrich villager in Animal Crossing: New Leaf and New Horizons
Blanche Devereaux, in the television series The Golden Girls and The Golden Palace
Blanche DuBois, in the play A Streetcar Named Desire and its adaptations 
The title character of the 1948 British film Blanche Fury, played by Valerie Hobson
Blanche Hunt, the character in the British soap opera Coronation Street, portrayed by Maggie Jones
 Blanche Ingram, from the novel Jane Eyre
Madamoiselle Blanche De Cominges, from Dostoyevsky's novel The Gambler
Blanche White, in the board game Cluedo (Clue in US)
Blanca Trueba, in Isabel Allende's novel The House of the Spirits
Blanche Buck, in the 1967 film Bonnie and Clyde
Blanche, a white cat in 1977 Japanese surrealistic horror film Hausu
Blanche, Kaede Saitou's angel in the anime and manga series Angelic Layer
Blanche Norton, from the 1950s comedy show, The George Burns and Gracie Allen Show. Bea Benaderet played the character.
Blanche, Team Mystic's leader from 2016 mobile game Pokémon Go.
Sister Blanche, in Francis Poulenc's opera Dialogues of the Carmelites.

See also
Blanche (surname)
Blanc

References

English feminine given names
French feminine given names